The 2015 Columbus mayoral election took place on November 3, 2015, to elect the Mayor of Columbus, Ohio. The election was officially nonpartisan, with the top two candidates from the May 5 primary advancing to the general election, regardless of party.

Incumbent Democratic Mayor Michael B. Coleman was not running for re-election to a fifth term in office.

Candidates

Democratic Party

Declared
 Andrew Ginther, President of the Columbus City Council
 James Ragland, development director at the Cristo Rey Columbus High School and former State Central Committeeman for the Ohio Democratic Party
 Zach Scott, Franklin County Sheriff

Declined
 Joyce Beatty, U.S. Representative (endorsed Ginther)
 Kevin Boyce, State Representative and former Ohio State Treasurer (endorsed Ginther)
 John Patrick Carney, State Representative and nominee for Ohio State Auditor in 2014
 Michael B. Coleman, incumbent mayor (endorsed Ginther)
 Tracy Maxwell Heard, Minority Leader of the Ohio House of Representatives
 Michael C. Mentel, attorney and former Columbus City Council President
 Michelle Mills, Columbus City Councilmember
 Charleta Tavares, State Senator

Republican Party

Declared
 Terry Boyd, former President of the Columbus Board of Education

Declined
 Jim Hughes, State Senator
 Ron O'Brien, Franklin County Prosecuting Attorney

Primary results

The Columbus Mayoral primary was nonpartisan, but candidates were endorsed by their parties. The two candidates who received the most votes advanced to the general election in November regardless of party.

General election results

References

Further reading

Mayoral elections in Columbus, Ohio
2015 Ohio elections
Columbus